Liptena rochei, the Roche's liptena, is a butterfly in the family Lycaenidae. It is found in Sierra Leone, Liberia, Ivory Coast, Ghana, Togo and western Nigeria. The habitat consists of the fringes of good quality forests.

References

Butterflies described in 1951
Liptena